myGovID is application software designed to allow users to authenticate with Australian Government websites and services. The app, developed by the Australian Tax Office and Digital Transformation Agency first launched in October 2019, with a public beta being performed earlier that year in June. myGovID was created to unify the various authentication methods employed by departments across federal and local governments, most notably AUSKey. The app allows users to verify their identity using biometrics such as fingerprints or facial recognition.

As of January 2021, the iOS version of the MyGovID app has a 1.7 / 5 rating on the Apple App Store and a 2.6 / 5 rating on the Google Play Store, with an overwhelming number of one star reviews in both app stores. Common issues raised in customer reviews are that the app has poor security (it is possible to register an account using commonly available information such as a drivers licence number, and it is possible to register multiple accounts for the same individual), the app refuses to recognise government-issued ID, does not permit changing most details, and has poor user interface / functionality.

On 1 April 2020, the Tax Office disabled its legacy AUSKey and "Manage ABN Connections" login methods in favour of myGovID. The subsequent traffic spike caused minor outages during the day.

References 

Government software
E-government in Australia
2019 establishments in Australia
Taxation in Australia